Rudolphus Henricus Cornelis "Roef" Ragas (25 May 1965 – 30 August 2007) was a Dutch actor from Harderwijk. He was the older brother of Bastiaan and Jeroen Ragas.

From 1984 to 1990 Ragas studied Dutch at the University of Amsterdam. He graduated on the phenomenon of "time" in  "De zondvloed" by Jeroen Brouwers. Then he went to the Amsterdam Theatre School, where he graduated in 1994.

He was a founding member of the Association of New Film and Television Makers, NFTVM, and sat on the board of the Dutch Association of Film and Television Makers, NBF, and the Dutch Film Festival. 

Ragas had a relationship since 1990 and was married to actress Susan Visser. Together they had two children. On 30 August 2007 Ragas died of sudden cardiac arrest at the age of 42, during a visit to Harkema restaurant. On Thursday 6 September 2007 he was buried in Zorgvlied Cemetery.

Filmography

Een Turk uit Italië (1992) - Paul
Richting Engeland (1993) -
Bureau Kruislaan TV series - Eddie Nagel (Afl., De harmonie van het toeval, 1993)
Hartverscheurend (1993) - Maarten
Toen Kooymans met vakantie was (Televisiefilm, 1994) - Frank
Pleidooi TV series- Te Riele, crimineel (Afl., Oslo, 1994)
Flodder TV series- Politieagent Jan (Afl., Kees verliefd, 1994)
Tralievader (Televisiefilm, 1995) - TV-monteur
De buurtsuper TV series - Don (Afl. alle, vast karakter, 1995)
Coverstory TV series - Michel (Episode 2.7, 1995)
Voor hete vuren TV series - Rol onbekend (Afl., Bakboordbrand, 1995)
De schaduwlopers (1995) - Jaloerse man
Mykosh (1995) - Pieter van de Berg
JuJu (1996) - Alex
Red Rain (1996) - Tony
Westzijde Posse TV series - Esteban (Afl. onbekend, 1996)
Goede daden bij daglicht: Site by Site (Televisiefilm, 1996) - Zwitser
Mijn moeder heeft ook een pistool (1996) - Kaj
Breaking the Waves (1996) - Pim
De Nieuwe Moeder (1996) - Vrachtwagenchauffeur
Baantjer TV series - Badjar (Afl., De Cock en de moord op de vader, 1996)
De zeemeerman (1996) - Uitsmijter
Gitanes (1997) - Jean
Windkracht 10 TV series- Harry (Afl., Vriend in nood, 1997)
Rondootje (1997) - Ricardo
12 steden, 13 ongelukken TV series- Rocky (Afl., Poldergeest (Westerwolde), 1997)
De fiets (1997) - Fietsenmaker
Arends (TV movie, 1997) - Hans, collega
All Stars (1997) - Vriend Sas
De verstekeling (1997) - Collega zeeman
I See You (1998) - Denis
Celluloid blues (1998) - John
Unit 13 TV series- Bram Teeuwen (Afl., Afscheid, 1998)
Ivoren wachters (1998) - Frits Schotel de Bie
Blindganger (1998), TV movie - Cafébezoeker
De Poolse bruid (1998) - Zoon
Combat TV series- Van den Bergh (Afl., Verdacht, 1998)
Vicious Circle (Televisiefilm, 1999) - Krol
in de clinch (TV series, 1998)
Missink Link (1999) - Adam
Maten (Televisiefilm, 1999) - Rob
Baantjer TV series - Albert Kruik (Afl., De Cock en de moord met illusie, 1999)
Total Loss (2000) - Duco van Poelgeest
Russen TV series - Frits (Afl., Carte Blanche, 2000)
Wildschut & De Vries TV series - Wennekers (2000)
Hundred Percent (2000) - Rol onbekend
De belager (Televisiefilm, 2000) - Advocaat
De zwarte meteoor (2000) - Jaap Stegehuis
Necrocam (2001) - Sander
Trauma 24/7 TV series- Robert van de Wetering (2002)
De Enclave (Televisiefilm, 2002) - Lex
Spangen TV series - Johan Laurens (Afl., Boete, 2002)
Russen TV series - Harm Vuijk (Afl., Satan huilt, 2002)
Pietje Bell (2002) - Jan Lampe, vader Sproet
Boy meets Girl Stories #18 Het Hart (Serie filmgedichten, 2003)
Brush with Fate (Televisiefilm, 2003) - Stijn
Pietje Bell 2: De Jacht op de Tsarenkroon (2003) - Jan Lampe
De Kroon (Mini-serie, 2004) - Prins Willem-Alexander
Karin (Korte film, 2004) - Berend
Grijpstra & De Gier TV series - Det. Rinus de Gier (36 afl., 2004-2006)
Doornroosje (Korte film, 2005) - Vader
Gloed (Korte film, 2006) - Jager
Schimmen (Pilot TV series, 2006)
Highland Gardens (Televisiefilm, 2007) - Frank

References

External links

Dutch male film actors
Dutch male television actors
1965 births
2007 deaths
People from Harderwijk
University of Amsterdam alumni